"Turn to You" is a 1984 single, released by the all-female pop band The Go-Go's. The song was the second single from the band's third album, Talk Show.

Written by Charlotte Caffey and Jane Wiedlin, the song was about Caffey's one-time boyfriend, baseball player Bob Welch.

Music video
The song's music video, co-directed by Mary Lambert and Chris Gabrin, featured a starring role for the then-up-and-coming actor Rob Lowe. The band members play suit-clad men (except for drummer Gina Schock, who is wearing a colorful dress) as they perform the song at a formal teen dance which appears to be taking place in the early to mid-1960s. The band members also play female party guests (except for Schock, who plays a male guest) watching and dancing to the music.

Chart positions

References

1984 singles
The Go-Go's songs
Songs written by Charlotte Caffey
Songs written by Jane Wiedlin
1984 songs
I.R.S. Records singles
Music videos directed by Mary Lambert